On June 13, 2020, two community activists local to the Tallahassee area, 19-year old Oluwatoyin Salau and 75-year old Victoria Sims, were found murdered in Tallahassee, Florida.

The suspect, Aaron Glee Jr., who was 49 at the time of the murders, was arrested and charged with first-degree  murder and felony murder among other charges. Prosecutors are seeking the death penalty.

Oluwatoyin Salau 

Salau was born on August 27, 2000, in Tallahassee, Florida. She was a Nigerian-American, A devout Christian, she was the youngest member of her church choir whilst growing up.

Salau attended Buck Lake Elementary School and Swift Creek Middle School in Tallahassee, and graduated from Lincoln High School in 2018. Following graduation, she studied cosmetology at Lively Technical College, simultaneously starting her business in hairdressing and modeling. In 2019, Salau enrolled at Tallahassee Community College while still at Lively, intending to study law at Florida A&M University thereafter.

Salau disappeared on Saturday, June 6, 2020, shortly after tweeting about being sexually assaulted. Salau was found murdered in Tallahassee, Florida, on Saturday, June 13, 2020, and her death was confirmed on Monday, June 15, 2020.

Salau was an active participant in the 2020 Black Lives Matter protests in Tallahassee, Florida, described as an "emerging leader" and "prominent voice" in the movement. She had advocated on behalf of Tony McDade in particular.

Salau's disappearance and discovery of bodies

Shortly before her disappearance, on June 6, 2020, she tweeted that she was sexually assaulted by a black man after he offered to give her a ride back to a church where she sought "refuge" because of "unjust living conditions". She was last seen alive on June 10, 2020.

After a search by community residents, the Tallahassee Community Action Committee, and Tallahassee Police Department, her body was found on June 14, 2020 around 9:15 pm local time near Monday Road in southeastern Tallahassee. Salau's body was discovered with that of Victoria Sims, a 75-year-old who had been active in local politics.

Salau was buried at Oakland Cemetery in Tallahassee.

Suspect
The suspect in Salau and Sims's deaths, Aaron Glee Jr., was arrested in Orlando, Florida during the early hours of June 14 and charged with murder and kidnapping. Glee later confessed to the murder and rape of Salau.

The bodies of Salau and Sims were found near his rental home in Tallahassee the night before. He had been arrested previously, less than a month prior, for aggravated battery after a police officer saw him kicking a woman in the stomach when she refused his sexual advances.

Reaction 
''RIP Toyin'' and ''Toyin'' trended on Twitter alongside the hashtag #JusticeForToyin after the news went out that Salau's body had been found. Abike Dabiri, chairman of the Nigerians in Diaspora Commission called on the U.S. Government to ensure a thorough investigation of Salau's murder.

References 

George Floyd protests in the United States
American people of Yoruba descent
Yoruba people
History of Tallahassee, Florida
Women deaths
Female murder victims
Violence against women in the United States
Sexual assaults in the United States